Avinash College of Commerce is an educational institute to train students in commerce and professional courses. It is located in Hyderabad in the state of Telangana, India, and opened in 2013. The institute is founded by Avinash Brahmadevara, a post-graduate triple qualified commerce professional.

Academics

Philosophy 
The core philosophy of the college lies in its industry-oriented pedagogy that emphasizes on industry-preparedness, business skills and professional ethics.

Courses 
The college offers intermediate courses in Economics and Commerce. It graduation courses of Bachelor of Business Administration (BBA) and Bachelor of Commerce (B.Com) and provides coaching for  professional courses of commerce namely Chartered Accountancy (CA), Cost Accounting (CWA) and Company secretary (CS). It also provides part-time courses for the professionals
.

The college also provides Certified Management Accountant (CMA) course in India.

Affiliations 
The college is affiliated to Osmania University for its regular courses. For the CMA course, it has partnered with Institute of Management Accountants (IMA USA).

Life on Campus
The campus is known for its fun-filled atmosphere and the cultural events.

References

Universities and colleges in Hyderabad, India
Colleges affiliated to Osmania University
Commerce colleges in India
Educational institutions established in 2013
2013 establishments in Andhra Pradesh